The 1928 Connecticut gubernatorial election was held on November 6, 1928. It was a rematch of the 1926 Connecticut gubernatorial election. Incumbent Republican John H. Trumbull defeated Democratic nominee Charles G. Morris with 53.57% of the vote.

General election

Candidates
Major party candidates
John H. Trumbull, Republican
Charles G. Morris, Democratic

Other candidates
Jasper McLevy, Socialist
William Mackenzie, Farmer–Labor
Michael P. O'Lean, Socialist Labor

Results

References

1928
Connecticut
Gubernatorial